Allodamaeus is a genus of oribatids in the family Plateremaeidae. There are at least 2 described species in Allodamaeus.

Species
 Allodamaeus coralgablensis Paschoal, 1987
 Allodamaeus ewingi Banks, 1947

References

Acariformes